Mishkafayim (Hebrew for “glasses”) was a Hebrew-language art magazine published by the Israel Museum in Jerusalem from 1987 to 2001.

History
Tamir Rauner was the founding editor in 1987 and served in this capacity for nine years. For its first two years, Mishkafayim was a joint project of the Israel Museum’s youth wing and the weekly magazine, Koteret Rashit (Hebrew for “main headline”). Koteret Rashit closed after the fifth issue of Mishkafayim. As a result, from the sixth issue onward, the daily newspaper Yedioth Ahronoth replaced Koteret Rashit as a partner in the publication of Mishkafayim.

Mishkafayim was an innovative addition to the Israeli cultural scene. It was a multidisciplinary magazine dedicated to culture that combined  written and visual content, providing a stage to new and established writers, artists, and illustrators.

In 1994, after Mishkafayim had appeared for seven years, Tamir Rauner launched Einayim, (Hebrew for "eyes"), a children’s magazine that was presented as "the younger brother of Mishkafayim", that is, a children’s magazine with an outlook similar to that of Mishkafayim.

In 1996, after two years of editing both magazines, Tamir Rauner left Mishkafayim and editor Smadar Tirosh replaced him starting with issue 26. Under Tirosh, the magazine’s character changed, taking a less innovative approach in content and form and beginning to appeal to a more mature audience. From issue 29 onward, its subtitle changed accordingly, from the "quarterly of the youth wing" to "art quarterly"; similar changes were made in its graphic design, including the design of its name.

In 2000, Monica Lavi replaced Smadar Tirosh and the magazine’s name was changed to Muza (Hebrew for "muse") which ceased publication in 2001.

Content
Each issue of Mishkafayim was dedicated to a main theme, such as drawing, writing, portraiture, comics, photography, legend, light, games, packaging, chair, material, illustration, artists, nature, movement, childhood, love, politics, time, sex and art, heroes, forgery, language, madness, dreams, maps, television, food, earth, and stone.

In some cases, the theme of the magazine was chosen in coordination with exhibitions at the Israel Museum Youth Wing, such as "Earth".

See also
Visual arts in Israel

References

External links
Images of Life: Israeli artist salutes women and their struggles

1987 establishments in Israel
2001 disestablishments in Israel
Defunct magazines published in Israel
Hebrew-language mass media
Magazines established in 1987
Magazines disestablished in 2001
Mass media in Jerusalem
Visual arts magazines published in Israel
Jewish magazines